Menachem Amir (1930-) is an Israeli criminologist. He spent most of his career as a professor at the Hebrew University of Jerusalem, where he was the Benjamin Berger Chair Professor of Criminology until he retired in 1999. Amir received the Israel Prize from the Israeli government in 2003 for his work, one of the first two criminologists to do so alongside Shlomo Giora Shoham.

Work 
Amir is best-known for his work on rape, including his article "Victim Precipitated Forcible Rape" (1968), and his first book Patterns in Forcible Rape (1971). His work was the first sociological study on the phenomenon of rape. Patterns in Forcible Rape, a study of rape cases in Philadelphia, Pennsylvania, between 1958 and 1960, is notable in characterizing rapists as psychologically normal. According to a contemporary review by Albert J. Reiss, a sociologist at Yale University, Patterns in Forcible Rape assembled more "information on forcible-rape victims and their alleged offenders" than any previous study on the subject.

Some American feminists utilized Amir's work in their anti-rape activism.

Amir has also worked on topics concerning juvenile delinquents, elderly victims of crime, and international organized crime.

Personal life 
Menachem Amir is married to Dr. Delilah Amir, a sociologist at Tel Aviv University. They have 2 children, Orly and Gili.

References 

Israeli criminologists
Academic staff of the Hebrew University of Jerusalem

1930 births
Living people